St. Boswells is a hamlet in Glen Bain Rural Municipality No. 105, Saskatchewan, Canada. The hamlet is about 8 km east of Highway 19, and about 25 km northwest of the town of Gravelbourg. Very little remains of the former village except a well known as the best water around, and sidewalks which mark the once prosperous business section of St. Boswells.

History

St. Boswells was a railroad town founded in 1918, as a Canadian National Railway point along the line from Moose Jaw to Neidpath. Named after Alex Dow's, hometown of St. Boswells, Roxburghshire, Scotland. St. Boswells was chosen as the name for the community's first post office.

See also
 Scottish place names in Canada
 List of communities in Saskatchewan
 Villages of Saskatchewan
 Hamlets of Saskatchewan

References

Glen Bain No. 105, Saskatchewan
Populated places established in 1918
Former villages in Saskatchewan
Unincorporated communities in Saskatchewan
Ghost towns in Saskatchewan
Division No. 3, Saskatchewan